The Rural Municipality of Mount Hope No. 279 is a rural municipality (RM) in the Canadian province of Saskatchewan within Census Division No. 10 and  Division No. 5.

History 
The RM of Mount Hope No. 279 incorporated as a rural municipality on December 11, 1911.

Demographics 

Geography

Communities and localities 
The following urban municipalities are surrounded by the RM.

Towns
 Raymore

Villages
 Punnichy
 Quinton
 Semans

The following unincorporated communities are within the RM.

Localities
 Booth
 Last Mountain
 Tate (dissolved as a village, May 15, 1961)

Attractions 
 Raymore Pioneer Museum
 Semans & District Museum
 Raymore Provincial Recreation Site
 Semans Recreation Centre (originally Madison Recreation Academy)

Government 
The RM of Mount Hope No. 279 is governed by an elected municipal council and an appointed administrator that meets on the second Tuesday of every month. The reeve of the RM is Bob Digney and its administrator is Ashley Greenshields. The RM's office is located in Semans.

Transportation 
 Saskatchewan Highway 6
 Saskatchewan Highway 15
 Saskatchewan Highway 640
 Saskatchewan Highway 641
 Saskatchewan Highway 744
 Canadian National Railway

See also 
List of rural municipalities in Saskatchewan

References 

M
Division No. 10, Saskatchewan